The 2017 Asian Women's Volleyball Championship was the nineteenth edition of the Asian Championship, a biennial international volleyball tournament organised by the Asian Volleyball Confederation (AVC) with Larong Volleyball sa Pilipinas, Inc. (LVPI). The tournament was held in both Biñan and Muntinlupa, Philippines from 9 to 17 August 2017.

Qualification
The fourteen AVC member associations were submit their women's national team to the 2017 Asian Volleyball Championship. The fourteen AVC member associations were from four zonal associations, including, Central Asia (4 teams), East Asia (5 teams), Oceania (2 teams), and Southeast Asia (3 teams). While West Asian teams did not submit any their women's national team.

Qualified teams
The following teams qualified for the tournament. Maldives qualified for the first tournament. New Zealand returned to qualified after 2007 edition.

Notes
The bold team will be the top positions in each pool.

Format

The tournament is played in three stages. In the first stage, the fourteen participants are divided in four groups. A single round-robin format is played within each group to determine the teams' group position (as per procedure below).
 
The two best teams of each group (total of 8 teams) progress to the second stage, the eight finalist are divided in two groups of four each. The pool standing will use the results and the points of the matches between the same teams that were already played during the preliminary round shall be taken into account for the classification round.

The third stage of the tournament consists of a single-elimination, with winners advancing to the next round until the final round.

Pool standing procedure
 Number of matches won
 Match points
 Sets ratio
 Points ratio
 Result of the last match between the tied teams

Match won 3–0 or 3–1: 3 match points for the winner, 0 match points for the loser
Match won 3–2: 2 match points for the winner, 1 match point for the loser

Pools composition

Preliminary round
The teams were seeded based on their final ranking at the 2015 Asian Women's Volleyball Championship. The host country and the top 7 ranked teams were seed in the Serpentine system. The 7 remaining teams were drawn on 27 February 2017 in Bangkok, Thailand.

Ranking from the previous edition was shown in brackets except the host (who ranked 12th) and the teams who did not participate, which were denoted by (–).

Classification round

Squads

Preliminary round
 All times are in Philippine Standard Time (UTC+08:00).

Pool A

|}

|}

Pool B

|}

|}

Pool C

|}

|}

Pool D

|}

|}

Classification round
All times are in Philippine Standard Time (UTC+08:00).
The results and the points of the matches between the same teams that were already played during the preliminary round shall be taken into account for the classification round.

Pool E

|}

|}

Pool F

|}

|}

Pool G

|}

|}

Pool H

|}

|}

Final round
All times are in Philippine Standard Time (UTC+08:00).

13th place match 
|}

9th–12th semifinals 
|}

11th place match 
|}

9th place match 
|}

Final eight

Quarterfinals
|}

5th–7th place semifinals
|}

Semifinals
|}

7th place match
|}

5th place match
|}

3rd place match
|}

Final
|}

Final standings

Awards

Most Valuable Player	
 
Best Setter
 
Best Outside Spikers
 
 

Best Middle Blockers
 
 
Best Opposite Spiker
 
Best Liberos

See also
2017 Asian Men's Volleyball Championship

References

External links

2017 Asian Women's Volleyball Championship squads - ABS-CBN

Asian women's volleyball championships
Voll
Asian Women's Volleyball Championship
International volleyball competitions hosted by the Philippines
Sports in Laguna (province)
Sports in Metro Manila
Muntinlupa
August 2017 sports events in Asia